The Maryland State Board of Censors was a three-member state agency that existed from 1916 to 1981 in the U.S. state of Maryland. No film could be officially released in the state without the approval of the board, which granted licenses to films it found "moral and proper".

The first agency decision to be appealed was the board's decision to ban the pacifist film War Brides (1916). The film had been approved in March 1917 for showing in state theaters, but shortly after the United States entered World War I, the film was banned in 1917 as it might affect military recruitment and for its pacifism. In 1918 a Baltimore City circuit court upheld the censorship board's decision. The court ruling was based on an Attorney General opinion that films calculated to obstruct or discourage recruitment were detrimental to the public morals.

Its powers were weakened after the Supreme Court case Freedman v. Maryland, 380 U.S. 51 (1965), which held that it could not outright ban a film's release through the refusal of a license, and had to secure a court order if it wanted to prevent a work from being shown.

In 1970, the authority of the State Board of Censors was assigned to the newly created Maryland Department of Labor, Licensing and Regulation. In 1981, the board was abolished as a cost-cutting measure: the application fees for film licenses generated around $12,000 in annual revenue, which did not come close to offsetting the board's budget of nearly $100,000. A resolution to save the board from disbandment failed in the Maryland Senate, and Governor Harry Hughes had pledged to veto it if it had passed. It was the last surviving film censorship board in any U.S. state.

The censor board was the subject of a documentary film called Sickies Making Films, released in 2018.

See also
 Film censorship in the United States
 Pennsylvania State Board of Censors

References

Censors
Film censorship in the United States
Government agencies established in 1916
1916 establishments in Maryland
1981 disestablishments in Maryland
Maryland Department of Labor